Sooramangalam is a panchayat village in Nettapakkam Commune in the Union Territory of Puducherry, India.

Geography
Sooramangalam is bordered by Kariyamanickam in the south and rest all three sides by villages belonging to Tamil nadu. Sooramangalam is located on the north tip of Nettapakkam Enclave.

Transport
Sooramangalam is located at 28 km. from Pondicherry. Sooramangalam  can be reached directly by any bus running between Pondicherry and Maducarai running via Madagadipattu.

Road Network
Sooramangalam is connected to Pondicherry by Frontier State Highway (RC-21).

Politics
Sooramangalam is a part of Nettapakkam (Union Territory Assembly constituency) which comes under Puducherry (Lok Sabha constituency)

References

External links
 Official website of the Government of the Union Territory of Puducherry

Villages in Puducherry district